South Carolina Highway 402 (SC 402) is a  primary state highway in the U.S. state of South Carolina. It serves to connect the community of Cordesville with the surrounding highways.

Route description
SC 402 is a two-lane rural road that begins at U.S. Route 52 (US 52) and U.S. Route 17 Alternate (US 17 Alt.) near Moncks Corner; per the South Carolina Department of Transportation, SC 402 ends at the pair of U.S. Highways though signage on US 52/US 17 Alt direct travelers "to" SC 402.  From there, it goes east, through Cordesville and by the Huger Recreational Area. At Huger, it ends at SC 41.  Because it traverses mostly in or along Francis Marion National Forest, majority of the route is forested.

History
Originally established in 1928, it traversed from US 17 near Moncks Corner to SC 40 near Whitehall Terrace. In 1939, SC 402's eastern terminus was truncated at Huger; its former routing to Whitehall Terrace replaced partly by SC 511 and the remainder becoming secondary roads: United Drive (S-8-598) and Guerins Bridge Road (S-10-98). In 1948, what remained of SC 402 was downgraded to a secondary road. In 1951 or 1952, it was re-established along the same routing now from US 52/US 17 Alt. split near Moncks Corner to SC 41 in Huger. It was officially extended to the pair of highways at an unknown date.

Major intersections

See also

References

External links

 
 SC 402 at Virginia Highways' South Carolina Highways Annex

402
Transportation in Berkeley County, South Carolina